Elliot "Elley" Bennett (1924-1981) was an Australian Aboriginal boxer. He was Australian champion in both the bantamweight and featherweight divisions.

In 2009 he was inducted into the Queensland Sport Hall of Fame.

Bennett was the 2005 Inductee for the Australian National Boxing Hall of Fame Veterans category.

References

1981 deaths
Indigenous Australian boxers
1924 births
Australian male boxers
Bantamweight boxers